Ab Barik-e Olya (also Romanized as Āb Bārīk-e ‘Olyā; also known as Āb Bārīk, Āb Bārīk-e Seyāh Kamar, Āb Bārīk Sīāh Kamar, and Āb-e Bārīk) is a village in Ab Barik Rural District, in the Central District of Sonqor County, Kermanshah Province, Iran. At the 2006 census, its population was 342 in 83 families.

References 

Populated places in Sonqor County